Dean Drummond (January 22, 1949 – April 13, 2013) was an American composer, arranger, conductor and musician. His music featured microtonality, electronics, and a variety of percussion. He invented a 31-tone instrument called the zoomoozophone in 1978. From 1990 to his death he was the conservator of the Harry Partch instrumentarium.

Biography

Born in Los Angeles, Drummond studied trumpet and composition at the University of Southern California and California Institute of the Arts. He studied trumpet with Don Ellis and John Clyman, and studied composition with Leonard Stein.

Drummond then worked as a musician for and assistant to the maverick composer and instrument builder Harry Partch. He performed in the premieres of Partch’s large-scale works Daphne of the Dunes, And on the Seventh Day Petals Fell in Petaluma, and Delusion of the Fury. Drummond also participated in recordings made by Partch for the Columbia Masterworks label in the late 1960s.

In 1976, Drummond moved to New York City. A year later he co-founded (with flutist Stefani Starin) the contemporary music ensemble Newband. Newband recorded works by Partch, John Zorn, Joan LaBarbara, John Cage, Anne LeBaron, James Pugliese, and Thelonious Monk, as well as original works by Drummond.

In 1990, he became director and curator of composer/inventor/musician Harry Partch's homemade instruments. Drummond performed many of Partch's compositions on the original instruments (such as kithara, surrogate kithara, harmonic canons, adapted guitar, and cloud chamber bowls), as well as incorporating the instruments into original compositions. Drummond conducted educational workshops, and trained student musicians to play the idiosyncratic instrumentarium.

Drummond was a director of the New York Consortium for New Music for over ten years, and was involved in producing the annual Sonic Boom Festival. At the time of his death he was Associate Professor and Director of the Harry Partch Institute at Montclair State University, New Jersey.

He died in Princeton, NJ, of complications from multiple myeloma on April 13, 2013.

Works

Most of his works are published by Hypersound.

Solo instrumental

Suite for Clarinet (1970) - clarinet
Organ Toccata (1971) - pipe organ
Cloud Garden II (1974) - piano/celeste/almglocken
Post Rigabop Mix (1977) - flute
Copégoro (1978) - percussion
Columbus Fullmoon (1979/1985) - zoomoozophone
Different Drums for Different Strokes (1988) - percussion
Mars Face (1997) - violin and microtonally programmed synthesizer
Four Miniatures (1997): Syncopation in Glass and Talking Bowls - cloud chamber bowls; Bow, Chords and Zoom and Three Dream Fragments - zoomoozophone duet
Two Short Zoomoozophone Duos (1997)
Two Short Solos for Cloud Chamber Bowls (1997)
Precious Metals (1997) - flute

Vocal compositions

Bertrans de Born (1971) - bass-baritone, flute, clarinet, bass clarinet, bassoon, French horn, piano/celeste, string quartet, double bass
My Data's Gone (1997)  - bass and microtonally programmed synthesizer - lyrics by Charles Bernstein
It Must Be Time (1997) - soprano and microtonally programmed synthesizer - lyrics by Charles Bernstein
Congressional Record (1999) - baritone and eight instrumentalists - texts from the Congressional Record
Café Buffé (2006) - opera - five singers, dancers, and eighteen instrumentalists - libretto by Charles Bernstein

Works for multiple instrumentalists

Ni Kioku (1971) - flute, celeste, harp, violin, cello, two percussionists
Dedication (1972) - oboe, harp, string quartet, double bass, three percussionists
Fission (1972) - flute, oboe, clarinet, bassoon, horn, trumpet, trombone, harp, vibraphone, violin, viola, cello
Ghost Tangents (1973/1975) - prepared piano, three percussionists
Cloud Garden I (1974/9) - flute, piano, four percussionists
Zurrjir (1976) - flute, clarinet, piano/celeste, three percussionists
Dirty Ferdie (Quartet Version) (1976) - four percussionists
Little Columbus (1979) (Part 1 of Columbus) (1980) - two percussionists
Columbus (1980) - flute, three percussionists
Dirty Ferdie (Octet Version) (1981) - eight percussionists
Mysteries (Octet Version) (1982/6) - flute, violin, cello, five percussionists
Mysteries (Quintet Version) (1983) - five percussionists
Mysteries (Septet Version) (1983) - flute, bass trombone, five percussionists
Then or Never (1984) - flute, viola, double bass, three percussionists
Ruby Half Moon (1987) - 2 trumpets, trombone, bass trombone, four percussionists
Incredible Time (to live and die) (1988) - amplified flute, microtonally programmed synthesizer, three percussionists
Dance of the Seven Veils (1992) - flute, cello, chromelodeon, microtonally programmed synthesizer, three percussionists
The Day the Sun Stood Still (1994) - flute, trumpet, cello, microtonally programmed synthesizer, harmonic canons, four percussionists
Before the Last Laugh (1995) - flute, cello, microtonally programmed synthesizer, three harmonic canons, two percussionists
The Last Laugh (Der Letzte Mann) (1996) - live film score for the 1924 silent film by F.W. Murnau -  flutes, cello, trumpet, chromelodeon, microtonally programmed synthesizer, four harmonic canons, four percussionists
For the Last Laugh (1998) - suite from the film score - flutes, cello, trumpet, chromelodeon, microtonally programmed synthesizer, four harmonic canons, four percussionists
M.S. Genitron (2001) - ten percussionists
Phil Harmonic (2002) - 2 flutes, 2 oboes, 2 clarinets, 2 bassoons, alto saxophone, 2 horns, 2 trumpets, 2 trombones, chromelodeon, zoomoozophone, timpani, percussion, strings

Films
1995 - Musical Outsiders: An American Legacy - Harry Partch, Lou Harrison, and Terry Riley. Directed by Michael Blackwood.

External links
 Composer's website
 Harry Partch website

References

American male classical composers
American classical composers
20th-century classical composers
21st-century classical composers
Deaths from multiple myeloma
Montclair State University faculty
1949 births
2013 deaths
American musical instrument makers
Musicians from Los Angeles
USC Thornton School of Music alumni
California Institute of the Arts alumni
Pupils of Harry Partch
21st-century American composers
20th-century American composers